Eastern University (EU) is a private Christian university in St. Davids, Pennsylvania, with additional locations in Philadelphia and Harrisburg. The university offers undergraduate, graduate, and seminary programs. Eastern University is affiliated with the American Baptist Churches USA and has an interdenominational student body, faculty and administration.

History 
The university has its origins in the foundation of Eastern Baptist Theological Seminary in 1925 in Philadelphia by six Conservative Baptist pastors from the American Baptist Publication Society.  In 1932, a collegiate department was founded. The school became a separate institution in 1952 and moved to its present St. Davids location, taking the name Eastern Baptist College. In 1972, it was renamed Eastern College. In 2001, the Pennsylvania Department of Education granted the institution university status and it was renamed Eastern University. In 2004, the institution's Board voted to acquire its previous parent institution and Eastern Baptist Theological Seminary became a subsidiary of Eastern University. The following year, the seminary changed its name to Palmer Theological Seminary in honor of its longest serving president, Gordon Palmer (1936–48).

Campus 
The main campus is on 114 acres just west of Philadelphia, in St. Davids, Pennsylvania. It was originally a private estate, named Walmarthon, which was owned by the Walton family. The size of the campus has expanded through purchases of surrounding buildings and land.

Warner Memorial Library is housed in the Harold Howard Center. The Mazie Hall African American History Room contains books and memorabilia from a local educator. The Edison Room houses several drawings and artifacts which belonged to Thomas Edison.

The Bradstreet Observatory consists of twin 14.5-foot diameter domes that house 16” diameter Meade LX200 Schmidt-Cassegrain telescopes. This addition to Eastern’s facilities created opportunities for astronomical work and research done on campus.

In addition to the main campus in St. Davids, Eastern has additional sites in Center City, Philadelphia; City Avenue, Philadelphia; and Harrisburg, Pennsylvania.

Academics 
Eastern University offers associate, bachelor's, master's, and doctorate degrees in more than 100 areas of study. The university also offers undergraduate, graduate and noncredit certificates. Academic programs at the institution are housed in seven schools:

 College of Arts and Humanities
 College of Business and Leadership
 College of Education
 College of Health and Sciences
 Palmer Theological Seminary
 Templeton Honors College
 Esperanza College

Accreditation 
Eastern University is accredited by the Middle States Commission on Higher Education. Several programs are also accredited:

 Accreditation Council for Business Schools and Programs (ACBSP)
 Association of Theological Schools in the U.S. and Canada
 Commission on Accreditation of Allied Health Education Programs
 Commission on Accreditation of Athletic Training Education
 Commission on Collegiate Nursing Education (CCNE)
 Council on Social Work Education (CSWE) for the Baccalaureate Major in Social Work
 Master’s in Psychology and Counseling Accreditation Council
 Association for Behavior Analysis International (Verified Course Sequence for Board Certified Behavior Analysts)
 American Society for Biochemistry and Molecular Biology (ASBMB)

Student media
The Waltonian is Eastern University’s student-run newspaper. It is published bi-weekly, and covers university, national, and international news.

Eastern is the magazine of Eastern University. It serves as a connection between the campus community of students, faculty, staff and administration and its alumni, trustees, friends, donors, parents and neighbors.

Athletics 
The school's sports teams are called the Eagles. They are Division III members of the National Collegiate Athletic Association (NCAA). Eastern University joined the Middle Atlantic Conferences (commonly referred to as the MAC) in 2008.

Sports include men's and women's soccer, men's and women's basketball, men's and women's volleyball, men's and women's lacrosse, men's baseball, women's field hockey, women's softball, men's and women's tennis, men's and women's golf, and cross country. Eastern began fielding a football team in 2022 as an NCAA Division III independent and will begin playing in the MAC in 2023.

In 2002, senior Andrea Collesidis broke an NCAA scoring record for women's lacrosse.

Notable people

Alumni 
 Morgan Hikaru Aiken, professional basketball player
 Tony Campolo, sociologist and pastor
Shane Claiborne, author, prominent figure in New Monasticism movement, founder of The Simple Way
Carolivia Herron, scholar of African-American Judaica
 Willie J. Hill Jr., bishop of the Reformed Episcopal Church
Doug Mastriano, politician and retired military officer
 Jamie Moffett, film director, producer, and social activist
 Richard Muenz, actor and singer
Marvin Rees, mayor of Bristol, England
Brandon 'Scoop B' Robinson, sports writer, radio host, television personality most notably with CBS Sports Radio
Bryan Stevenson, founder and executive director of the Equal Justice Initiative
Regina Young, member of the Pennsylvania House of Representatives

Faculty 
 Phillip Cary, philosophy professor, philosopher, Augustine scholar, and author
 Peter Enns, history of religions professor, scholar, author
 Wilson Goode, professor emeritus and former mayor of Philadelphia
 Christopher Hall, emeritus professor, Episcopalian theologian
 Ron Sider, professor, activist, author, and founder/president emeritus of Evangelicals for Social Action

References

Further reading

External links 

 

 
Radnor Township, Delaware County, Pennsylvania
Universities and colleges affiliated with the American Baptist Churches USA
Educational institutions established in 1925
Universities and colleges in Delaware County, Pennsylvania
Council for Christian Colleges and Universities
1925 establishments in Pennsylvania
Private universities and colleges in Pennsylvania